Steve Draper is a former American slalom canoeist who competed in the mid-to-late 1970s. He won a bronze medal in the mixed C-2 event at the 1975 ICF Canoe Slalom World Championships in Skopje.

References

American male canoeists
Living people
Year of birth missing (living people)
Medalists at the ICF Canoe Slalom World Championships